Cyril Jackson may refer to:

 Cyril Jackson (priest) (1746–1819), Dean of Christ Church, Oxford 1783–1809
 Cyril Jackson (astronomer) (1903–1988), South African astronomer
 Cyril Jackson (educationist) (1863–1924), British educationist